Ana Lucía Spross Urrutia (born 15 May 1982) is a Guatemalan football manager and a former footballer who played as a goalkeeper. She has been a member of the Guatemala women's national team.

Early life
Spross hails from Guatemala City.

College career
In 2018, 36-years-old Spross joined the College of the Canyons in Santa Clarita, California, United States and played for its women's soccer team, known as the Cougars. Next year, she became the assistant coach of the side.

International career
Spross capped for Guatemala at senior level during the 2010 Central American and Caribbean Games and the 2010 CONCACAF Women's World Cup Qualifying.

References

1982 births
Living people
Guatemalan women's footballers
Guatemala women's international footballers
Women's association football goalkeepers
Sportspeople from Guatemala City
College women's soccer players in the United States
College of the Canyons alumni
Guatemalan expatriate footballers
Guatemalan expatriate sportspeople in the United States
Expatriate women's soccer players in the United States
Guatemalan football managers
Female association football managers
Women's association football managers
College women's soccer coaches in the United States
Expatriate soccer managers in the United States
Guatemalan expatriate football managers